Cyperus grandibulbosus is a species of sedge that is endemic to parts of eastern Africa.

The species was first formally described by the botanist Charles Baron Clarke in 1901.

See also
 List of Cyperus species

References

grandibulbosus
Taxa named by Charles Baron Clarke
Plants described in 1901
Flora of Ethiopia
Flora of Kenya
Flora of Somalia
Flora of Tanzania